Dendrobium sulcatum, the furrowed-lip dendrobium, is an orchid native to Asia, in the family Orchidaceae.

Distribution and habitat
The plant is native to:
The Eastern Himalayas — in Bhutan, China in Yunnan, and Northeastern India in Assam, Arunachal Pradesh, and Sikkim.
Northern Indochina — in Laos, Thailand, and Myanmar.
It is an epiphyte and grows on tree trunks in dense forests.

References

External links

sulcatum
Flora of East Himalaya
Flora of Indo-China
Orchids of Yunnan
Plants described in 1838